The Melaka International Motorsport Circuit (MIMC) is a motorsport racetrack in Ayer Keroh, Malacca, Malaysia.

History
The motorsport circuit was opened in 2009.

Tracks
 Go-kart 1.6 km track
 Motorcycle sprint 200 meters
 Night racing light 1,000 lux
 Remote control car track

Facilities
The circuit area is equipped with two-tier grandstand capable to accommodate 800 visitors, parking bays, office, ticketing booth, operation room, service and inspection area and pit stops.

See also
 List of tourist attractions in Malacca

References

2009 establishments in Malaysia
Motorsport venues in Malaysia
Sports venues completed in 2009
Sports venues in Melaka